On Friday, October 2, 1908, Addie Joss pitched a perfect game, the fourth in Major League Baseball history, and only the second in American League history. He threw it at League Park, in Cleveland, Ohio.

Background
The Detroit Tigers, Chicago White Sox, and Joss's Cleveland Naps were engaged in a race for the post-season at the time of the game, with the Tigers seeking their second straight pennant, the White Sox trying to win their second in three years, and the Naps looking for their first. Three games remained in the regular season and the Naps were a half-game behind the Detroit Tigers as they headed into a match-up against the Chicago White Sox, who trailed the Naps by one game. Game attendance was announced at 10,598.

The game
The Naps faced future Hall of Fame pitcher Ed Walsh and recorded four hits; they were struck out by Walsh 15 times. The Naps' Joe Birmingham scored the team's only run, which came in the third inning. In the ninth inning, Joss retired the first two batters, then faced pinch hitter John Anderson. Anderson hit a line drive that would have resulted in a double had it not gone foul. He then hit a ball to Naps third baseman Bill Bradley which Bradley bobbled before throwing to first baseman George Stovall. Stovall dug the ball out of the ground to preserve the Naps' 1–0 lead. Joss's catcher in the game was the much traveled Jay Clarke.

Boxscore

Aftermath
With the win, Joss recorded a perfect game, the second in American League history. He accomplished the feat with just 74 pitches, the lowest known pitch count ever achieved in a perfect game. Fans swarmed the field after the win, though the Naps finished half a game out of first place to the Tigers.

The perfect game was the first of two no-hitters Joss pitched during his career. He no-hit the White Sox a second time on April 20, 1910, also by a 1–0 score. He was the only pitcher to throw two no-hitters against the same team until San Francisco Giant Tim Lincecum no-hit the San Diego Padres on July 13, 2013, and June 25, 2014.

References

Joss
Cleveland Indians
Chicago White Sox
1908 Major League Baseball season
1900s in Cleveland
October 1908 sports events
1908 in sports in Ohio
Baseball competitions in Cleveland